Coumatetralyl is an anticoagulant of the 4-hydroxycoumarin vitamin K antagonist type used as a rodenticide.

Common applications
Coumatetralyl is commonly used with grains and other cereals as a rodent poison in conjunction with a tracking powder to monitor feeding activity in a particular area. Tracking powder also clings to fur, which allows more poison to be ingested from grooming. Concentrations of the chemical are usually 500 mg per 1 kg of bait.

Toxicity to humans
Symptoms of overexposure relate to failure of the blood clotting mechanism and include bleeding gums and failure of blood clotting after skin wounds. After one exposure the toxicity of coumatetralyl is relatively low; however, if overexposure continues for several days the product becomes more toxic. The product must therefore be constantly present in the bloodstream for more than one to two days in order to be highly toxic. A single exposure, even though relatively large, may not produce toxic symptoms as the compound is quite rapidly metabolized.

Chronic animal studies show no evidence of carcinogenic or teratogenic effects.

Treatment
Vitamin K1 (phylloquinone) is antidotal.

See also
 C19H16O3

References

Anticoagulant rodenticides
Vitamin K antagonists
Tetralins
Coumarin drugs
Phenols
4-Hydroxycoumarins